Ian Chen may refer to:

 Ian Chen (actor) (born 2006), American actor
 Ian Chen (musician) (born 1991), Taiwan singer and actor
 Ian Chen (born 1971), member of Taiwanese band F.I.R.